Jefferson Andrade Siqueira or simply Jefferson (born 6 January 1988) is a Brazilian footballer who plays as a striker for Italian  club Catania.

Career
Jefferson started his career at A.D. Guarulhos – SP playing for the Juniores – U 20 team. He was considered a top talent and impressed many scouts with his exceptional football brain and skills.  Jefferson moved to Paraná Clube – PR in 2004.
  catching the attention of numerous European teams.
Fiorentina signed the player for the 2008/ 2009 season.
In August 2009 Jefferson was loaned to Frosinone in order to play a season of first team football. Fiorentina wanted the player to get a full season of football so that for the 2010/ 2011 season Jefferson could start playing for the Fiorentina first team.
Frosinone caused a lot of off field problems, which meant the player moved to Cassino in January 2010 for the remainder of the 2009/2010 season as the team is only 30 minutes away from Frosinone. Jefferson played 13 games and scored 7 goals for Cassino.

On 10 January 2019, he joined Giana Erminio on loan.

On 2 September 2019, he signed with Monopoli.

On 10 August 2020 he moved to Padova on a 1-year deal. On 29 January 2021 he was loaned to Catanzaro.

References

External links
 
 
 placar
 Profile

1988 births
Living people
People from Guarulhos
Footballers from São Paulo (state)
Brazilian footballers
Association football forwards
Paraná Clube players
Serie B players
Serie C players
ACF Fiorentina players
Frosinone Calcio players
A.S.D. Cassino Calcio 1924 players
Latina Calcio 1932 players
U.S. Livorno 1915 players
Casertana F.C. players
S.S. Teramo Calcio players
U.S. Viterbese 1908 players
A.C. Monza players
A.S. Giana Erminio players
S.S. Monopoli 1966 players
Calcio Padova players
U.S. Catanzaro 1929 players
Catania S.S.D. players
Belgian Pro League players
K.A.S. Eupen players
Brazilian expatriate footballers
Expatriate footballers in Italy
Expatriate footballers in Belgium
Brazilian expatriate sportspeople in Italy
Brazilian expatriate sportspeople in Belgium